Fletcher Lee Skidmore (May 12, 1898 – September 10, 1965) was a college football player.

Early years
Skidmore was born May 12, 1898 in Decatur, Alabama to James Sells and Bertha Weeber Skidmore.

Sewanee
Skidmore was a prominent tackle for the Sewanee Tigers football team of Sewanee: The University of the South. He was also a member of the track team.  At one time he held the record for the 16 pound shot put. While at Sewanee and for some years after, he lived in Winchester, Tennessee.

1921
In the 17–0 victory over Alabama, Skidmore gave the Tigers an early 3–0 lead with his 40-yard field goal in the first quarter. He was selected All-Southern.

References

1898 births
1965 deaths
Sewanee Tigers football players
American football tackles
American football placekickers
All-Southern college football players